Hinckley Leicester Road Football Club is a football club based in Hinckley, England.

History
When Hinckley United folded in October 2013, two clubs were formed to replace them; Hinckley AFC and Leicester Road. Leicester Road were accepted into Division Two of the newly formed Midland League for the 2014–15 season. They were runners-up in their first season, earning promotion to Division One, where they would play Hinckley AFC for the first time.

In 2016–17 Leicester Road club won the Leicestershire and Rutland Senior Cup, beating Holwell Sports 2–1 in the final. In 2021 the club were promoted and transferred to the Premier Division South of the United Counties League based on their results in the abandoned 2019–20 and 2020–21 seasons. In September 2021 the club were renamed Hinckley LRFC. The 2021–22 season saw them finish second in the Premier Division South, earning promotion to Division One Midlands of the Northern Premier League.

Season-by-season

Ground
Following their formation, both Hinckley AFC and Leicester Road attempted to secure the right to use Leicester Road Stadium. Leicester Road were ultimately successful in purchasing the stadium, with Hinckley AFC having to groundshare at Heather St John's.

Honours
Leicestershire and Rutland Senior Cup
Winners 2016–17

Records
Best FA Cup performance: First qualifying round, 2016–17
Best FA Vase performance: First round, 2016–17, 2019–20
Record attendance: 426 vs Bromsgrove Sporting, Midland League Division One, 11 April 2017
Biggest win: 11–0 vs Southam United, Midland League Division One, 8 April 2017

See also

References

External links
Official website

 
Football clubs in England
Football clubs in Leicestershire
2013 establishments in England
Association football clubs established in 2013
Midland Football League
United Counties League
Northern Premier League clubs
Hinckley